Philipp Müller may refer to:

 Philipp Müller (politician) (born 1952), Swiss politician
 Philipp Müller (handballer) (born 1984), German handball player
 Philipp Müller (footballer) (born 1995), German footballer
 Philipp Ludwig Statius Müller, German zoologist
 Philipp Wilbrand Jacob Müller, German entomologist
 Philipp Muller (civil servant), director-general of the Pacific Islands Forum Fisheries Agency, 1981–1991